Heok Hee Ng is a Singaporean ichthyologist and researcher of biodiversity at the Lee Kong Chian Natural History Museum of the National University of Singapore. He specialises in Asian catfish systematics with particular focus on sisoroid catfishes. As of 2018, Ng authored 14 species of Siluriformes

Publications
Ng has (co-)authored many publications. 
See Wikispecies below.

See also
:Category:Taxa named by Heok Hee Ng

References

External links 

Living people
Taxon authorities
Singaporean ichthyologists
Year of birth missing (living people)